Simona Cavallari (born 6 June 1992) is a Swiss handballer. She currently plays for LK Zug in Switzerland and for the Swiss National team.

References

External links 
 LK Zug Website  
 Simona Cavallari Profile at the official Website of LK Zug  
 Profile on the official European Handball Federation Webside

Swiss female handball players
1992 births
Living people
Sportspeople from Zürich